Amare may refer to:

Music
"Amare" (Adrijana song)
"Amare" (Mino Vergnaghi song)
"Amare" (La Rappresentante di Lista song)

People

Amare Aregawi, Ethiopian journalist
Amaré Barno (born 1999), American football player
Amar'e Stoudemire (born 1982), American-Israeli basketball player
Girmaw Amare (born 1987), Israeli runner
Hailemariyam Amare (born 1997), Ethiopian runner

See also
Te Amaré (disambiguation)
Amari (disambiguation)